Norway is a country in Northern Europe. The word may also refer to:

Places

Canada
Norway, Toronto a former name of a portion of the Upper Beaches neighbourhood
Norway House, Manitoba
Norway, Prince Edward Island
New Norway, Alberta

United States
Norway, Illinois
Norway, Indiana
Norway, Iowa
Norway, Kansas
Norway, Maine, a New England town
Norway (CDP), Maine, the main village in the town
Norway, Michigan
Norway, Nebraska
Norway, New York
Norway, Oregon
Norway, South Carolina
Norway, Wisconsin

Other uses
Kingdom of Norway (872–1397), the old Norwegian Realm from the early to high Middle Ages
Kingdom of Norway (1814), short-lived state
Nevil Shute Norway (1899–1960), a British aeronautical engineer and novelist who published under the pen name "Nevil Shute"
The SS France (1961), which sailed for much of its operational life as SS Norway
"Norway" (song), by Beach House, from the album Teen Dream
Sons of Norway, a North American fraternal organization
Norway pine, Pinus resinosa, a pine native to North America
Norway spruce, Picea abies, a spruce native to Europe
Norway Pavilion at Epcot, one of the 11 countries at EPCOT
Norway (film), a 2018 film directed by Paul Greengrass based on the 2011 Norway attacks

See also
Norge (disambiguation), the Norwegian name for Norway
Norwegian (disambiguation)